Yekaterina Alexandrovna Lycheva (born 10 June 1974), also known with her first name abbreviated to Katya, is a Soviet-born Russian woman who served as a child "Goodwill ambassador" to the United States in 1986. She also acted in a number of Soviet films for children. She was born in Moscow.

Goodwill visit to the United States
Lycheva's visit to the United States was a Soviet response to a highly publicised visit to the Soviet Union by 11-year-old Maine resident Samantha Smith in 1983. Together with Star Rowe, an 11-year-old American girl, Lycheva visited cities across the United States, including New York, Los Angeles, and Washington D.C. Lycheva met the mayors of the cities she visited and met with President Ronald Reagan in Washington.  A book was published about her travels.

Two years after her visit, she moved with her mother to Paris, and returned to Russia in 2000.  Lycheva has since then lived a reclusive life, creating speculation as to her whereabouts.  The Russian television program Priyamoj Efir attempted unsuccessfully to locate her in September 2016.

Family and lineage
On her mother's side, Katya Lycheva is the great-granddaughter of Maria Ovsyannikova (1904-1985), who was close to Joseph Stalin functionary of Soviet special services with extensive personal connections in the midst of the Soviet nomenclature. She is also the granddaughter of the Soviet film actor Anatoly Ignatiev (1926-1986), who played Soviet WWII hero Alexander Matrosov in the same name film.

Film career
Lycheva appeared in five children's films produced in the Soviet Union.

References

Further reading
 Making Friends. Katya from Moscow and Star from San Francisco: Two Eleven-Year-Old Girls Discover America Together. New York, 1987.

External links

1974 births
Living people
Russian child actresses
Russian film actresses
Soviet child actresses
Soviet film actresses